Burkina Faso coup d'état may refer to one of several attempted or successful coup d'états in Burkina Faso or Upper Volta:
 1966 Upper Voltan coup d'état
 1974 Upper Voltan coup d'état
 1980 Upper Voltan coup d'état
 1982 Upper Voltan coup d'état
 1983 Upper Voltan coup d'état attempt
 1983 Upper Voltan coup d'état
 1987 Burkina Faso coup d'état
 1989 Burkina Faso coup d'état attempt
 2003 Burkina Faso coup d'état attempt
 2014 Burkina Faso uprising
 2015 Burkina Faso coup d'état attempt
 2016 Burkina Faso coup d'état attempt
 January 2022 Burkina Faso coup d'état
 September 2022 Burkina Faso coup d'état